Abarimon or antipode in mythology are people whose feet are turned backwards, but in spite of this handicap were able to run at great speed.

In Europe, this tribe was first described by Pliny the Elder, in his book, Natural History (VII 11), who considered them to be native to India. A similar tale is recounted by Aulus Gellius in Attic Nights.

They lived side by side with wild animals and attempts to capture them failed because they were so savage. Pliny refers to information that originates from Baiton, which was Alexander the Great's Land Surveyor. Baiton says that the abarimons could only breathe the air in their own domestic valleys. Because of the special quality of air, which meant if it was breathed for a long period of time, it would be impossible to breathe any other type of air. Therefore the inhabitants were unable to leave the valley and live anywhere else. And so it was impossible to capture them and bring them to the courts of a distant ruler, or to the great Macedonian conquest.  Plinius,  Naturalis Historia 7, 11.

It is possible that this is an overly designed ethnographic description of an ancient wildlife strain in the areas near Himalayas.

According to another legend, Abarimon is mentioned as a landscape in Scythia, a valley of Mount Imaus, (which may be identical to Hindukush or the Himalayan Mountains).

Later, Abarimon has been briefly described in Thomas Cooper's Thesaurus Linguae Romanae et Britannicae, as a tribe in the country  Tataria . During the Middle Ages, some mapdrawers, after a familiar heliocentric view, have made monsters in the form of Abarimon people and placed them at the outer border of the world.

See also
Ciguapa
Curupira
Nuli

References

Natural History of Pliny. John Bostock, Henry Thomas Riley, translators. George Bell & Sons, 1890.

External links
 http://www.lizaphoenix.com/encyclopedia/abarimon.shtml The Phoenixian Book of Creatures.

Mythic humanoids
Roman legendary creatures
Himalayan peoples
Mythological peoples